Josh D. Lee (born November 21, 1979, in Vinita, Oklahoma) is an American lawyer. A shareholder at Lee|Coats, PLC in Vinita, Oklahoma, he has a national practice. He focuses his practice on two specific areas of criminal defense:
1) DUI/DWI and other alcohol-related charges, and 2) drug charges. He is most known as an advocate of open government and has successfully sued governments in the State of Oklahoma to enforce Oklahoma's Open Records law.

Early years
He was born and raised in Vinita, Oklahoma. He is the only child of Jack and Dolores Lee. He worked as a 911 dispatcher and police officer for the Vinita Police Department after high school. He earned his Associate of Arts in Criminal Justice from Northeastern Oklahoma A&M in Miami, Oklahoma. He went on to graduate from Rogers State University in Claremore, Oklahoma, with a Bachelor of Science in Business Information Technology – Software and Multimedia Design. He received his J.D. degree with honors in 2007 from University of Tulsa College of Law. In 2016, he earned a Master of Science in Pharmacy from the University of Florida.

Early legal career
Lee started his legal career as a licensed legal intern for the Tulsa County District Attorney's Office. He was assigned to work the Major Crimes Team when he left to go into private practice. In 2007, he joined Clinton M. Ward and his practice in Vinita, Oklahoma, and formed Ward & Lee, PLC. A couple years later Cassandra Coats joined the firm and it was renamed Ward Lee & Coats, PLC. In 2019, Josh Lee and Cassandra Coats went out on their own, building a new building in downtown Vinita, and opened the firm Lee|Coats Law, PLC.

Major cases 
Lee is known for his published appellate advocacy in open government cases, including Ward & Lee, PLC v City of Claremore, 2014 OK CIV APP 1, which established public's right to access police and sheriff dash cam recordings under the Oklahoma Open Records Act.

Lee brought a lawsuit against Washington and Nowata County District Judge Curtis DeLapp, alleging widespread abuses of power. Ultimately the Oklahoma Supreme Court filed a removal petition against Judge DeLapp accusing him of "gross neglect" and "oppression in office." Eventually the disgraced Judge resigned from the bench and withdrew his bid for reelection. In July 2020, Reuters Investigates began publishing a series of long format stories on judicial misconduct in the United States called Teflon Robe. Part 2 “Emboldened By Impunity” focused on the misconduct of Judge Delapp and JoLee's role in his removal.

In the DUI and criminal law context, he has been the attorney of record for the following cases:

 Exonerations of Malcolm Scott and De'Marchoe Carpenter. On May 19, 2016, a Tulsa County District Judge found Scott and Carpenter "actually innocent" of a 1994 drive-by shooting that landed them a prison sentence of Life + 170 years. Scott and Carpenter became the 31st and 32nd individuals to be exonerated in Oklahoma since 1989. The 21 years and 8 months that they spent in prison as wrongfully convicted men was the longest served of any of the 30 previous exonerees in Oklahoma. Lee, along with Oklahoma Innocence Project Legal Director Christina Green, represented Scott in this matter. His closing argument from the January 29, 2016 hearing drew high praise from journalists and local court watchers. He also successfully represented both Scott and Carpenter when District Attorney Steve Kunzweiler appealed the exonerations.  
 Andrews v. State, 2014 OK CIV APP 19. In this case, the appellate courts determined that paramedics are not approved to withdraw blood for Oklahoma Implied Consent Cases
 State v. Mayes. In this case, the charges were thrown out at preliminary hearing against a 74-year-old woman who lived in a home where marijuana and about $277,000 in cash were seized.
Lee is a forensic science commentator of articles, including articles in Chemistry World, Colorado Springs Independent, and Chemical & Engineering News, Other publications include chapters in the books Understanding DUI Scientific Evidence (2011 Edition), and The Legality of Search and Seizure in DUI Cases, along with articles for The South Carolina Bar Association, Tennessee Criminal Defense Lawyers Association, and Texas Criminal Defense Lawyers Association

Professional associations

 Freedom of Information Oklahoma, Inc - Board of Director (01/2014–Present) 
 Chemistry and the Law Division of the American Chemical Society - Executive Committee Member/Forensic Science Co-chairman

Recognition
In 2018, Lee was recognized by the Oklahoma Bar Association by receiving the Fern Holland Courageous Lawyer Award. He was featured in Oklahoma Magazine's 40 Under 40 for 2018 recognizing the "best the state has to offer in virtually all fields of business." In 2014, Freedom of Information Oklahoma, Inc. named the law firm of Ward, Lee, & Coats, PLC, Josh Lee, and Steve Fabian, as honorable mention for the groups Ben Blackstock Award. The award is to recognize private citizens and organizations who shows a commitment to freedom of information and government transparency.

He has been recognized by state and national defense related organizations for his contributions to the citizens and the defense bar:
 Oklahoma Criminal Defense Lawyers Association President's Award - 2018
 Oklahoma Criminal Defense Lawyers Association President's Award - 2013
 National College for DUI Defense Dean's Award - 2013
 Texas Criminal Defense Lawyers Association Public Proclamation - 2012

References

External links 
 Lee|Coats Law, PLC
 Grand Lake DUI

1979 births
Living people
American lawyers
Criminal defense lawyers